Mooresville Commercial Historic District is a national historic district located at Mooresville, Morgan County, Indiana.  The district encompasses 35 contributing buildings and 1 contributing object in the central business district of Mooresville.  It developed between about 1872 and 1952, and includes notable examples of Italianate, Gothic Revival, Classical Revival, Commercial Style, and Bungalow/American Craftsman style architecture.  Notable buildings include the Farmer's State Bank, Nelson and Son Hardware, Mooresville Carnegie Library (1916), Carlisle and Gilbert Building (1895), Pure Oil Service Station, A.H. Scruggs Building, Mooresville Municipal Building, and Mooresville Methodist Episcopal Church complex.

It was listed on the National Register of Historic Places in 2003.

References

Historic districts on the National Register of Historic Places in Indiana
Italianate architecture in Indiana
Neoclassical architecture in Indiana
Gothic Revival architecture in Indiana
Bungalow architecture in Indiana
Historic districts in Morgan County, Indiana
National Register of Historic Places in Morgan County, Indiana